Hazlehurst is a city in and the county seat of Jeff Davis County, Georgia, United States. The population was 4,226 at the 2010 census.

History
Hazlehurst was founded circa 1880 as a depot on the Macon and Brunswick Railroad. The community was named for railroad surveyor Col. George Hazlehurst.

Geography
Hazlehurst is located in southeast Georgia, and is served by U.S. routes 23, 221 and 341.

Climate

Demographics

2020 census

As of the 2020 United States census, there were 4,088 people, 1,494 households, and 894 families residing in the city.

2000 census
At the census of 2000, there were 3,787 people in 1,513 households, including 1,039 families, in the city. There were 1,810 housing units. The racial makeup of the city was 68.55% White, 27.67% African American, 0.42% Native American, 0.74% Asian, 1.66% from other races, and 0.95% from two or more races. Hispanic or Latino of any race were 3.43% of the population.

Of the 1,513 households 30.7% had children under the age of 18 living with them; 44.7% were married couples living together; 19.8% had a female householder with no husband present; and 31.3% were non-families. 28.0% of households were one person and 12.2% were one person aged 65 or older. The average household size was 2.44 and the average family size was 2.95.

The age distribution was 26.2% under the age of 18, 9.1% from 18 to 24, 24.0% from 25 to 44, 24.8% from 45 to 64, and 16.0% 65 or older. The median age was 38 years. For every 100 females, there were 85.1 males. For every 100 females age 18 and over, there were 79.1 males.

The median household income was $24,306 and the median family income  was $27,890. Males had a median income of $27,436 versus $18,304 for females. The per capita income for the city was $12,996. About 21.1% of families and 26.4% of the population were below the poverty line, including 40.0% under age 18 and 25.7% age 65 or over.

Education

Jeff Davis County School District 
The Jeff Davis County School District consists of two elementary schools, a middle school, and a high school. The district has 149 full-time teachers and over 2,624 students.
Jeff Davis Elementary School
Jeff Davis Primary School
Jeff Davis Middle School
Jeff Davis High School

References

Cities in Georgia (U.S. state)
Cities in Jeff Davis County, Georgia
County seats in Georgia (U.S. state)